Idiomarinaceae is a Gram-negative and mesophilic family in the order of Alteromonadales. Bacteria of the family Idiomarinaceae occur in saline environments.

References

Further reading 
 

Alteromonadales